Dispersive may refer to:

Dispersive partial differential equation, a partial differential equation where waves of different wavelength propagate at different phase velocities
Dispersive phase from Biological dispersal
Dispersive medium, a medium in which waves of different frequencies travel at different velocities
Dispersive adhesion, adhesion which attributes attractive forces between two materials to intermolecular interactions between molecules
Dispersive mass transfer, the spreading of mass from highly concentrated areas to less concentrated areas
Dispersive body waves, an aspect of seismic theory
Dispersive prism, an optical prism
 Dispersive hypothesis, a DNA replication predictive hypothesis
Dispersive fading, in wireless communication signals
Dispersive line
Dispersive power

See also
 Dispersal (disambiguation)
 Dispersion (disambiguation)